Çukurova is a large fertile plain in the Cilicia region of southern Turkey.

Çukurova may also refer to

 Çukurova, Adana, a municipality in Greater Adana, Turkey
 Çukurova (construction firm), based in Istanbul, Turkey

See also